In mathematics, specifically linear algebra, a degenerate bilinear form  on a vector space V is a bilinear form such that the map from V to V∗ (the dual space of V&hairsp;) given by  is not an isomorphism.  An equivalent definition when V is finite-dimensional is that it has a non-trivial kernel: there exist some non-zero x in V such that

 for all

Nondegenerate forms
A nondegenerate or nonsingular form is a bilinear form that is not degenerate, meaning that   is an isomorphism, or equivalently in finite dimensions, if and only if
 for all  implies that .

The most important examples of nondegenerate forms are inner products and symplectic forms. Symmetric nondegenerate forms are important generalizations of inner products, in that often all that is required is that the map  be an isomorphism, not positivity. For example, a manifold with an inner product structure on its tangent spaces is a Riemannian manifold, while relaxing this to a symmetric nondegenerate form yields a pseudo-Riemannian manifold.

Using the determinant
If V is finite-dimensional then, relative to some basis for V, a bilinear form is degenerate if and only if the determinant of the associated matrix is zero – if and only if the matrix is singular, and accordingly degenerate forms are also called singular forms. Likewise, a nondegenerate form is one for which the associated matrix is non-singular, and accordingly nondegenerate forms are also referred to as non-singular forms. These statements are independent of the chosen basis.

Related notions
If for a quadratic form Q there is a non-zero vector v ∈ V such that Q(v) = 0, then Q is an isotropic quadratic form. If Q has the same sign for all non-zero vectors, it is a definite quadratic form or an anisotropic quadratic form.

There is the closely related notion of a unimodular form and a perfect pairing; these agree over fields but not over general rings.

Examples
The study of real, quadratic algebras shows the distinction between types of quadratic forms. The product zz* is a quadratic form for each of the complex numbers, split-complex numbers, and dual numbers. For z = x + ε y, the dual number form is x2 which is a degenerate quadratic form. The split-complex case is an isotropic form, and the complex case is a definite form.

The most important examples of nondegenerate forms are inner products and symplectic forms. Symmetric nondegenerate forms are important generalizations of inner products, in that often all that is required is that the map  be an isomorphism, not positivity. For example, a manifold with an inner product structure on its tangent spaces is a Riemannian manifold, while relaxing this to a symmetric nondegenerate form yields a pseudo-Riemannian manifold.

Infinite dimensions
For example, on the space of continuous functions on a closed bounded interval, the form 
 
is not surjective: for instance, the Dirac delta functional is in the dual space but not of the required form.  On the other hand, this bilinear form satisfies 
 for all  implies that 
In such a case where ƒ satisfies injectivity (but not necessarily surjectivity), ƒ is said to be weakly nondegenerate.

Terminology
If f vanishes identically on all vectors it is said to be  totally degenerate. Given any bilinear form f on V the set of vectors

forms a totally degenerate subspace of V. The map f is nondegenerate if and only if this subspace is trivial.

Geometrically, an isotropic line of the quadratic form corresponds to a point of the associated quadric hypersurface in projective space. Such a line is additionally isotropic for the bilinear form if and only if the corresponding point is a singularity. Hence, over an algebraically closed field, Hilbert's Nullstellensatz guarantees that the quadratic form always has isotropic lines, while the bilinear form has them if and only if the surface is singular.

See also

Citations

Bilinear forms
Functional analysis

pl:Forma dwuliniowa#Własności